KAFD World Trade Center is a skyscraper in the King Abdullah Financial District of Riyadh, Saudi Arabia. The Abraj Al Bait, Capital Market Authority Headquarters, and Burj Rafal are taller, while KAFD is slightly taller than the older and well-known Kingdom Centre. The tower was designed by Gensler.

See also
List of tallest buildings in Saudi Arabia

References

Skyscrapers in Riyadh
Buildings and structures in Riyadh
Commercial buildings completed in 2016